Mushoku Tensei is a Japanese anime series based on the light novel series of the same title.  It follows jobless and hopeless man who dies after having a sad and reclusive life and reincarnates in a fantasy world while keeping his memories, determined to enjoy his new life without regrets under the name Rudeus Greyrat. 

It was directed by Manabu Okamoto and animated by Studio Bind, with Kazutaka Sugiyama designing the characters, and Yoshiaki Fujisawa composing the music. Egg Firm is credited for production. The series was originally scheduled to premiere in 2020, but it was delayed until January 2021. The first half aired from January 11 to March 22, 2021 on Tokyo MX, KBS, BS11, and SUN. The second half was originally set to premiere in July 2021, but was delayed to October 2021. The second half aired from October 4 to December 20, 2021. The series ran for 23 episodes. Toho released both parts of the first season on Blu-ray across 4 volumes, with the first volume releasing on April 21, 2021. The anime's fourth Blu-ray volume was released on March 16, 2022, and included an unaired episode.

All of the openings and endings were performed by Yuiko Ōhara.

Funimation licensed the series and streamed it on its website in North America, Mexico, Brazil and the British Isles, in parts of Europe, Central Asia and North Africa through Wakanim, and in Australia and New Zealand through AnimeLab. The series also streamed on Hulu in the United States. On February 13, 2021, Funimation announced the series would be receiving an English dub, with the first episode premiering the next day. Following Sony's acquisition of Crunchyroll, the series was moved to Crunchyroll. Crunchyroll released the first 11 episodes on DVD and Blu-ray in North America on December 5, 2022. Muse Communication has licensed the series in Southeast Asia and South Asia and streamed it on their Muse Asia YouTube channel and its respective regional variants, and on iQIYI, Bilibili and WeTV in Southeast Asia, Netflix in South Asia and Southeast Asia, Catchplay in Indonesia and Singapore, meWATCH in Singapore, and Sushiroll in Indonesia. 

On March 6, 2022, it was announced that a second season has been green-lit. It is set to premiere in 2023.

Episode list

Home media release

Japanese

English

Notes

References

External links
 Official anime website 

Mushoku Tensei